AJ-60A is a solid rocket booster produced by Aerojet Rocketdyne. Up to 2020 they were used as strap-on boosters on the United Launch Alliance Atlas V rocket.

History
The AJ-60A rocket motor was developed between 1999 and 2003 for use on the Atlas V. 

New Horizons passed the Moon's orbit in just nine hours.

In 2015, ULA announced that the Atlas V will switch to new GEM 63 boosters produced by Northrop Grumman Innovation Systems. (GEM 63XL, a stretched version of the GEM 63 booster will be used on the upcoming Vulcan rocket.) The first Atlas V launched with GEM 63 boosters on November 13, 2020.

Design
AJ-60A is a solid fueled rocket burning HTPB. The casing is composed of a graphite epoxy composite, and the engine throat and nozzle are made of carbon-phenolic composite. As configured for use on Atlas V, the nozzle is fixed at a 3 degree cant away from the attachment point, but Aerojet offers a variant with thrust vectoring capability. The Atlas V configuration also features an inward slanting nosecone, but it is available with a conventional nosecone or none at all for use on other rockets. The stages are designed to be transported by truck.

References

Rocketdyne engines
Solid-fuel rockets
Rocket engines of the United States